Sønderborg Municipality, is a municipality (Danish, kommune) in Region of Southern Denmark partially on the Jutland peninsula and partially on the island of Als in south Denmark, at the border with Germany. Its mayor as of 1 January 2014 is Erik Lauritzen, a member of the Social Democratic party.

Geography
The municipality is split into two sections separated by Alssund, the waterway which separates the island of Als from the Jutland mainland.

Locations

The city of Sønderborg

The site of its municipal council is the town of Sønderborg.

Politics
Sønderborg's municipal council consists of 31 members, elected every four years. The municipal council has nine political committees.

Municipal council
Below are the municipal councils elected since the Municipal Reform of 2007.

2007 administrative reform
On January 1, 2007, due to Kommunalreformen ("The Municipal Reform" of 2007), the former Sønderborg municipality, located on Als and the mainland, was combined with Augustenborg (on Als), Broager, Gråsten, Nordborg (on Als), Sydals (on Als), and Sundeved municipalities to form a new Sønderborg municipality. The municipality shares the number one position with Lolland Municipality of being formed through the merger of most former municipalities in the reform of 2007:seven (7). Its last mayor was Arne Peder Hansen, a member of the Venstre (Liberal Party) political party.

Economy
The municipality is home to two of the major industrial companies in Denmark: Danfoss and Linak.

North Schleswig Germans
Sønderborg Municipality is home to the only officially recognised ethno-linguistic minority of Denmark proper, the North Schleswig Germans. This minority makes up about 6% of the total population of the municipalities of Aabenraa/Apenrade, Haderslev/Hadersleben, Sønderborg/Sonderburg and Tønder/Tondern. In these four municipalities, the German minority enjoys certain linguistic rights in accordance with the European Charter for Regional or Minority Languages.

International relations

Twin towns — Sister cities
Sønderborg is twinned with:
 Zabrze Poland
 Baoding China

References 

 Municipal statistics: NetBorger Kommunefakta, delivered from KMD aka Kommunedata (Municipal Data)
 Municipal mergers and neighbors: Eniro new municipalities map

External links 

  
 Joint webportal for public offices, business and non-profit organisations 
 Tourist attractions in Sønderborg 
 Video showing the town of Sønderborg
 Student association in Sønderborg

 
Municipalities of the Region of Southern Denmark
Municipalities of Denmark
Populated places established in 2007